Nannophya occidentalis is a species of dragonfly of the family Libellulidae, 
known as the western pygmyfly. 
It inhabits boggy seepages and swamps in south-western Australia.

Nannophya occidentalis is a small dragonfly with black and red markings similar to Nannophya dalei, the eastern pygmyfly, which is found in south-eastern Australia.

Gallery

See also
 List of Odonata species of Australia

References

Libellulidae
Odonata of Australia
Endemic fauna of Australia
Taxa named by Robert John Tillyard
Insects described in 1908